Bright Star Wilderness is a  wilderness area in Kern County in the U.S. state of California.

The California Desert Protection Act of 1994 (Public Law 103–433) added the wilderness to the National Wilderness Preservation System and it is administered by the Bureau of Land Management (BLM).

Bright Star Wilderness surrounds  Kern County's Kelso Peak and drainages to the north, south and east, including Bright Star Canyon and Cortez Canyon.

The Wilderness lies within the BLM's Jawbone-Butterbredt Area of Critical Environmental Concern in the higher Mojave Desert and protects much of the Piute Mountains, of the southern Sierra Nevada (not to be confused with the Piute Mountains to east in Mojave National Preserve).

Vegetation
A wide variety of vegetation grows in the Bright Star Wilderness.  The upper slopes of Kelso Peak are dotted with Single-leaf piñon pine (Pinus monophylla) and California juniper (Juniperus californica), while the lower slopes are brushy and broken by large granite outcroppings.  The valley below the peak is dense with Joshua trees (Yucca brevifolia).

See also
 List of U.S. Wilderness Areas
 Wilderness Act

References

External links
 
 
 
 
 

Protected areas of Kern County, California
Protected areas of the Mojave Desert
Protected areas of the Sierra Nevada (United States)
Wilderness areas of California
Bureau of Land Management areas in California